Protein expression and purification may refer to:

 Protein production, the process of generating some quantity of a specific protein using living organisms
 Protein purification, the process of separating a specific protein from a mixture of proteins and other molecules
 Protein Expression and Purification (journal), a peer-reviewed scientific journal on these biotechnology topics